This is the list of awards and nominations received by deadmau5, a Canadian record producer and DJ from Toronto, Ontario.

Amongst his major competitive achievements, Zimmerman has won five Beatport Music Awards, four DJ Awards, three International Dance Music Awards (IDMA), three Juno Awards, and has also received six Grammy Award nominations and one World Music Award nomination. Overall in his career to date he has won 15 competitive awards and received 42 nominations.

Beatport Music Awards
On 1 May 2008, Zimmerman became the most awarded artist of the Beatport Music Awards. He was named "Best Progressive House Artist" by Beatport. (In 2009, Beatport also awarded Zimmerman the most awards that year, winning first place in both of his nominations, as well as being given the "Greatest House DJ Ever" award, two years in a row). In June 2010, Beatport announced the winners of their annual Beatport Music Awards, awarding Zimmerman Best Electro House Artist, Best Progressive House Artist, and as the "most influential, relevant and forward-thinking person in electronic music over the past 12 months".

|-
| rowspan="4"| 2008
| rowspan="2"| deadmau5
| Best Electro House Artist
| 
|-
| Best Progressive House Artist
| 
|-
| "Not Exactly"
| Best Single
| 
|-
| "Community Funk" (deadmau5 Remix) by Burufunk, Carbon Community
| Best Remix
| 
|-
| rowspan="2"| 2009
| rowspan="2"| deadmau5
| Best Electro House Artist
| 
|-
| Best Progressive House Artist
| 
|-

DJ Awards
The DJ Awards organizes the annual electronic music DJ awards event it is the only international ceremony for DJs and also the oldest, the awards are held once a year at Pacha club in Ibiza Spain it is one of the most important accolades an artist can win or be honoured by.

Zimmerman has won the Best International DJ Award 2010 and the Best Electro House DJ Award three times.

|-
| rowspan="2"| 2008
| rowspan="2"| deadmau5
| Best Electro House DJ
| 
|-
| Best Breakthrough Artist
| 
|-
| 2009
| deadmau5
| Best Electro House DJ
| 
|-
| rowspan="2"| 2010
| rowspan="2"| deadmau5
| Best Electro House DJ
| 
|-
| Best International DJ
| 
|-
| 2011
| deadmau5
| Best Electro House DJ
| 
|-
| 2012
| deadmau5
| Best Electro House DJ
| 
|-
| 2013
| deadmau5
| Best International DJ
|

DJ Magazine Awards
Zimmerman was also named "Producer of 2007" by DJ Magazines 2007 Top 100 winner Armin van Buuren, and by runner up Tiësto. In 2008, he placed No. 11 in the DJ Magazine Top 100 poll, the highest new entry in the poll's history, showing Zimmerman's fast rise to prominence. Artists are nominated to the top 100 list for each year the public decides who they rank as the World's No 1 DJ at the end of the poll.

Grammy Awards

|-
| 2009
| "The Longest Road" (deadmau5 Remix) (Morgan Page feat. Lissie)
|rowspan="2"| Best Remixed Recording, Non-Classical
| 
|-
|rowspan="3"| 2012
| "Rope" (deadmau5 Remix) (Foo Fighters)
| 
|-
| "Raise Your Weapon" (feat. Greta Svabo Bech)
| Best Dance Recording
| 
|-
| 4x4=12
|rowspan="3"| Best Dance/Electronic Album
| 
|-
| 2013
| > album title goes here <
| 
|-
| 2015
| while(1<2)
| 
|-

International Dance Music Awards
In March 2010, Zimmerman was nominated for four International Dance Music Awards himself, and his music for three more awards, winning three, including Best Artist (Solo) and Best Canadian (see complete list below).

|-
| rowspan="7"| 2010
| rowspan="4"| deadmau5
| Best Canadian DJ
| 
|-
| Best Artist
| 
|-
| Best Global DJ
| 
|-
| Best Producer
| 
|-
| rowspan="2"| "Ghosts 'n' Stuff" (feat. Rob Swire)
| Best Electro Track
| 
|-
| Best Video
| 
|-
| "Strobe"
| Best Progressive/Tech Track
| 
|-

Juno Awards
Zimmerman received two nominations for the Juno Award for Dance Recording of the Year at the Juno Awards of 2008 for a track with Billy Newton-Davis and Melleefresh. He did not win an award for Melleefresh's "After Hours" song, but he won the award for Newton-Davis' "All U Ever Want".

|-
| rowspan="2"| 2008
| "Afterhours" (with Melleefresh)
| Dance Recording of the Year
| 
|-
| "All U Ever Want" (with Billy Newton-Davis)
| Dance Recording of the Year
| 
|-
| rowspan="2"| 2009
| Random Album Title
| Dance Recording of the Year
| 
|-
| "Move for Me" (with Kaskade)
| Dance Recording of the Year
| 
|-
| 2010
| For Lack of a Better Name
| Dance Recording of the Year
| 
|-
| 2012
| deadmau5
| Artist of the Year
| 
|-
| 2013
| deadmau5
| Artist of the Year
| 
|-
| 2013
| > album title goes here <
| Dance Recording of the Year
| 
|-
| 2015
| deadmau5
| Artist of the Year
| 
|-

Shorty Awards
In 2018, Zimmerman was nominated by the Shorty Awards for Twitch Streamer of the Year.

|-
| 2018
| deadmau5
| Twitch Streamer of the Year
| 
|-

World Music Awards
The World Music Awards''' is an international awards show founded in 1989 under the high patronage of Albert II, Prince of Monaco and is based in Monte-Carlo. Awards are presented to the world's best-selling artists in the various categories and to the best-selling artists from each major territory. Sales figures are provided by the International Federation of the Phonographic Industry(IFPI). Nine awards are voted online by the public. The awards are gold-plated, each depicting an artist holding the world.

Zimmerman was nominated in the 2010 category the Worlds Best DJ''.

|-
| 2010
| deadmau5
| Worlds Best DJ
|

References

External links
 
 Artist Site at Ultra Records

Deadmau5